Yun Chi-sung (hangul:윤치성, hanja:尹致晟 or 尹致晠, March 2, 1875, Asan - August 11, 1936) was an Imperial Korean military personnel, politician and independence activist. His nickname was Agyeon (악연, 岳淵). He was the uncle of Yun Posun, and the cousin of Yun Chi-ho and Yun Chi-Wang.

Life 
Yun was born on March 2 1875 in Asan. He was the third son of Yun Yeong-ryeol. He was one of the students sent to Japan. He entered the Keio University on 5 November 1885 and graduated in 1886 November. He later returned his country after being commissioned to shavetail of Imperial Korea. He entered the course of becoming an officer. On 25 November 1899, Yun graduated the military academy. On 25 June 1900, Yun was appointed as cavalry Second lieutenant. In 1905, he was veterans to the Russo-Japanese War. Returnees since worked at the Department of Defense of the Korean Empire, also appointed to department of Defense Education supervisor. In 1905, he was joined to anti movement against of Japan–Korea Treaty of 1905 also he was identity of the soldiers. On 10 October 1905, Yun became part of the Ministry of Military. In December 1905, Yun was removed from the Ministry of Military.

On 10 January 1906, he was one of the Attaché sent to Empire of Japan as a Cavalry Captain. While he was in Japan, Yun became a Cavalry major and received 4th Class of Order of the Sacred Treasure from Japanese Government. On 10 February 1906, Yun returned to Korea. After returning Korea, Yun became part of the Ministry of Military. On 18 October 1906, Yun was promoted to Lieutenant Colonel. On 7 June 1907, Yun became Emperor Gojong's equerry. On 6 September, Yun got a horse from Sunjong of Korea for his merits. On 2 October 1907, Yun became the chairman of education of military education. But he retired and became reserve on 31 July 1909. Empire of Japan considered Yun as a person needed caution. When Yun visited Japan in 1909, Yun was watched by the Japanese Resident-General of Korea. In 1908, he retired from the army and became a businessman. From 1906 to 1923, Yun participated in establishments of companies in Seoul. Yun was part of the Korea Liberation Corps in 1916. During the colonial period, Yun was required to cooperate with Japanese, which he refused.

Honours 

 Order of the Taegeuk 4th class on 9 September 1907
 Order of the Palgwae 3rd class on 28 October 1909

 Order of the Rising Sun 6th class on 31 March 1905
 Order of the Sacred Treasure 4th class on 28 January 1906

References

Site web 
 Haepyung Yun's family home 

1875 births
1936 deaths
Japanese military personnel
Korean revolutionaries
People from Asan
Imperial Korean military personnel
Japanese military personnel of the Russo-Japanese War
Korean Christians
Converts to Christianity